The 2003–04 season was the 89th season of the Isthmian League, which is an English football competition featuring semi-professional and amateur clubs from London, East and South East England.

It was the last season for the Isthmian League as a feeder for the Conference Premier. At the end of the season, the Premier Division was replaced as a level 6 league (along with the Northern Premier League Premier Division and Southern Football League Premier Division) by the newly formed Conference North and Conference South. The Premier Division lost more than half its clubs to newly formed divisions, and the two regional divisions had a number of their clubs promoted to the Premier Division to replace them. Thus, the Isthmian League divisions downgraded to 7-9 levels.

Premier Division

The Premier Division consisted of 24 clubs, including 19 clubs from the previous season and five new clubs:
 Bognor Regis Town, promoted as runners-up in Division One South
 Carshalton Athletic, promoted as champions of Division One South
 Hornchurch, promoted as runners-up in Division One North
 Kettering Town, relegated from the Conference National
 Northwood, promoted as champions of Division One North

Canvey Island won the division and were promoted to the Conference National. Clubs finished higher than 14th position were to transfer to the newly created Conference North and South divisions and clubs finished higher than 21st position plus winners of division One were to participate in the play-offs for a two final spots in Conference North/South. After play-offs was held Hendon decided not to take up their option to join the Conference, their place was taken by Basingstoke Town. At the end of the season Ford United were renamed Redbridge.

There were no relegation from the Premier Division this season, though, due to league reform, clubs remained in the division downgraded from sixth tier to seventh.

League table

Stadia and locations

Play-offs

Division One North

Division One North consisted of 24 clubs, including 18 clubs from the previous season, and six new clubs:
 Boreham Wood, relegated from the Premier Division
 Chesham United, relegated from the Premier Division
 Cheshunt, promoted as champions of Division Two
 Dunstable Town, promoted as champions of the Spartan South Midlands League
 Enfield, relegated from the Premier Division
 Leyton, promoted as runners-up in Division Two

Before the start of the season Leyton Pennant was renamed Waltham Forest.

Yeading won the division, but lost in the play-offs for a place in the newly created Conference North and South and were placed in the Premier Division along with Leyton and Cheshunt. Chesham United, Dunstable Town and Hemel Hempstead Town were transferred to the Southern Football League Premier Division. They were followed by Wealdstone, who defeated Dulwich Hamlet from Division One South. Enfield finished bottom of the table and relegated to Division Two, going down from sixth to ninth tier in two years due to league system reform.

At the end of the season divisions One were merged, all the remaining Division One North clubs were transferred to the Southern Football League Division Ones.

League table

Stadia and locations

Division One South

Division One South consisted of 24 clubs, including 21 clubs from the previous season, and three new clubs:
 Hampton & Richmond Borough, relegated from the Premier Division
 Marlow, transferred from Division One North
 Slough Town, transferred from Division One North

Lewes won the division and subsequent play-offs and were promoted to the Conference South. Clubs finished second to sixth were transferred to the Premier Division. Epsom & Ewell finished bottom of the table and were relegated, remaining clubs were to start next season in the merged Isthmian League Division One, going down with it from seventh to ninth level due to creation of Conference North/South.

League table

Stadia and locations

Division Two

After Hungerford Town resigned from the league, Division Two consisted of 15 clubs, including 12 clubs from the previous season, and three new clubs:
 Chertsey Town, relegated from Division One South
 Hertford Town, relegated from Division One North
 Wembley, relegated from Division One North

Leighton Town won the division and were transferred to Southern Football League Division One, while runners-up Dorking were transferred to the merged Isthmian League Division One. At the end of the season Wokingham Town merged into Emmbrook Sports (9° Reading League Premier Division) to create new club Wokingham & Emmbrook F.C., who joined Hellenic League Division One East.

League table

Stadia and locations

See also
Isthmian League
2003–04 Northern Premier League
2003–04 Southern Football League

References

External links
Official website

Isthmian League seasons
6